Hits or H.I.T.S. may refer to:

Arts, entertainment, and media

Music
 H.I.T.S., 1991 album by New Kids on the Block
 ...Hits (Phil Collins album), 1998
 Hits (compilation series), 1984–2006; 2014 - a British compilation album series
 Hits (Dru Hill album), 2005
 Hits (Mike + The Mechanics album), 1996
 Hits (Kylie Minogue album), 2011 - an EMI compilation album released only in Japan, Hong Kong, and the Philippines
 Hits (Joni Mitchell album), 1996
 Hits (New Found Glory album), 2008
 Hits (Pulp album), 2002
 Hits (Seal album), 2009
 Hits (Mauro Scocco album), 1997
 Hits (Spice 1 album), 1998
 Hits (Billy Talent album), 2014
 Hits (The Beach Boys EP), 1966
 Hits (Tony! Toni! Toné! album), 1997
 Hits: Greatest and Others, 1973 - album by Joan Baez
 Hits 1979–1989, 1989 - album by Rosanne Cash
 Hits+, 2000 - album by Kylie Minogue
 Hits! (Kim Kay album), 2000
 Hits! (Boz Scaggs album), 1980
 Hits! The Very Best of Erasure, 2003 - album by Erasure

Other uses in arts, entertainment and media
Hits (film), a 2014 film by David Cross
Hits (magazine), American music industry publication

Initialisms
 Headend in the Sky, satellite communications facility
 Heidelberg Institute for Theoretical Studies, a private non-profit research institute in Heidelberg, Germany
 Heparin-induced thrombocytopenia syndrome, an immune mediated cause of low platelet count due to heparin
 High-impulse thermobaric weapons (HITs), a type of explosive that relies on oxygen from the surrounding air
 Highway in the sky, or The Advanced General Aviation Transport Experiments (AGATE) project, a consortium whose goal was to create a Small Aviation Transportation System (SATS) 
 Highway In The Sky, synthetic vision system for pilots
 Hindustan Institute of Technology and Science, in Chennai, Tamil Nadu, India
 HITS algorithm, Hypertext Induced Topic Selection for Web-page rating
 Homicide Investigation Tracking System, murder and rape case database

See also
 Hit (disambiguation)
 The Hits (disambiguation)